Revelashen, stylized as the phonetic "/ˌrevəˈlāSH⁽ᵊ⁾n/", is the fourteenth studio album by American hip hop duo Twiztid. It was released on November 27, 2020 via Majik Ninja Entertainment. Production was handled by Michael "Seven" Summers, Young Wicked and ScatteredBrains. It features guest appearances from Young Wicked, Kid Bookie and Lex "The Hex" Master.

Track listing

Charts

References 

2020 albums
Twiztid albums
Majik Ninja Entertainment albums
Albums produced by Seven (record producer)